The speaker of the Assembly of the Representatives of the People is the presiding officer of the Assembly of the Representatives of the People, the unicameral legislature of Tunisia.

From 1956 to 1959, the Tunisian legislature was called the National Constituent Assembly, from 1959 to 1981 the National Assembly, from 1981 to 2011 the Chamber of Deputies and from 2011 to 2014 the Constituent Assembly. Since 2014, it is called the Assembly of the Representatives of the People.

The Speaker of the Assembly serves as ex officio Vice-President of Tunisia. In the event of the resignation, permanent incapacity or death of the President of the Republic, the speaker of the Assembly ascends as interim president for a minimum of 45 days and a maximum of 90 days, pending new elections.

From the creation of the Chamber of Advisors in 2002 until the Revolution in 2011, the Chamber of Deputies was the lower house of the Parliament of Tunisia.

List

See also
Chamber of Deputies (Tunisia)
Constituent Assembly of Tunisia
Assembly of the Representatives of the People

Politics of Tunisia
Tunisia, Chamber of Deputies, Speakers